Ozumchi (also Romanized as Ozūmchī; also known as Owzūmchī and Ūzūmchī) is a village in Abbas-e Sharqi Rural District, Tekmeh Dash District, Bostanabad County, East Azerbaijan Province, Iran. As of the 2006 census, its population was 149, in 40 families.

References 

Populated places in Bostanabad County